Fustifusus is a genus of sea snails. There is a single species in the genus: Fustifusus pinicola.

References

Columbariidae
Monotypic gastropod genera